Street Fighter Alpha: Warriors' Dreams, known as  in Japan, Asia, South America, and Oceania, is a 2D  arcade fighting game by Capcom originally released in 1995 for the CP System II hardware. It was the first all new Street Fighter game produced by Capcom since the release of Street Fighter II in 1991.

The game introduces several new features, expanding on the Super Combo system previously featured in Super Street Fighter II Turbo, with graphics drawn in a similar art style to the one Capcom employed in Darkstalkers and X-Men: Children of the Atom. The plot of Street Fighter Alpha is set after the original Street Fighter but before Street Fighter II and thus the game features younger versions of established characters, as well as characters from the original Street Fighter and Final Fight, and a few who are new to the series. The game's story in this first entry of Zero/Alpha is officially no longer canon.

Gameplay
Street Fighter Alpha revamps the Super Combo system introduced in Super Street Fighter II Turbo by adding a three-level Super Combo gauge. Like in Super Turbo, the Super Combo gauge fills in as the player performs regular and special techniques. When the gauge reaches Level 1 or higher, the player can perform a Super Combo technique. The number of punch or kick buttons pressed simultaneously when performing a Super Combo determines the amount that will be used. In addition to Super Combos, the player can also perform a special counterattacking technique called an Alpha Counter (Zero Counter in the Japanese version) after blocking an opponent's attack, which consumes a level of the Super Combo Gauge.

There are two playing styles that can be selected after choosing a character: "Normal" and "Auto". Auto differs from Normal in that the character automatically guards against a limited number of attacks (provided the character is not in the middle of performing an attack). Auto also allows the player to perform an instant Super Combo by pressing a punch and kick of the same strength simultaneously, but at the expense of reducing the maximum level of the Super Combo gauge to one.

There are also new basic techniques such as Air Blocking, the ability to guard in mid-air, and Chain Combos (also known as Alpha Combos, or Zero Combos in Japan), which are combos that are performed by interrupting the animation of one basic move by performing another of equal or greater strength. In addition to recovering from an opponent's throw, the player also has the ability to roll on the ground when they fall to the ground after an attack.

The single player mode consists of seven random computer-controlled opponents and a final opponent whose identity depends on the storyline of the player's selected character. M. Bison is the final boss for half of the characters. There are also two hidden characters: Akuma, who returns from Super Turbo as an alternate final boss only after certain in-game requirements are met, and a new character named Dan (a popular Capcom spoof character), who challenges the player during the course of the game if certain requirements are met.

The game also features a secret two-on-one Dramatic Battle mode in which two players as Ryu and Ken fight against a computer-controlled M. Bison, a match inspired by the final fight between the characters in Street Fighter II: The Animated Movie (the Japanese arcade version of the game plays an instrumental rendition of the movie's battle theme, "Itoshisato Setsunasato Kokorozuyosato", which was replaced by M. Bisons regular theme in the overseas releases).

Characters
The immediate character roster includes Ryu, Ken, Chun-Li and Sagat from the Street Fighter II series, along with Birdie and Adon (Sagat's former apprentice) from the original Street Fighter, who make their first appearances as playable characters in this game. Guy, one of the main playable characters from Final Fight, also appears along with Sodom, a boss character from the same game. New to the series are Charlie, Guile's combat buddy who uses the same special techniques, and Rose, an Italian female fortune teller who uses an energy known as "Soul Power".

In addition to the ten regular characters, there are also three boss characters in the game. Street Fighter II antagonist M. Bison appears as a final opponent for many of the characters in the single-player mode, while Akuma from Super Street Fighter II Turbo once again appears as a secret final opponent. Another secret character, Dan, Capcom's parody of SNK characters Ryo Sakazaki and Robert Garcia, makes his first appearance in this game. All three characters can be selected by the player by inputting a specific code for each.

Development
Game production for the game started in October, 1994, after the release of Darkstalkers: The Night Warriors. The development team was given only 3 months to complete a game from scratch, but ended up completing development six months after production started.

The working title name started out as Street Fighter Legends during early development to give the team an idea on what kind of roster they are about to work with, this name would be later used in one of the UDON comic book adaptations. Later on during development, a prototype name started as Street Fighter Classic, since it was meant to take place between Street Fighter and Street Fighter II, it was meant to be converted to the Super Famicom, and would ended up sharing the same initials ('SFC'). The name eventually changed to Street Fighter Zero, as it would stand to an origin point. Capcom Public Relations in North America disliked the name, as it sounded much negative, so it was renamed it to Street Fighter Alpha in western territories (except Brazil), to sound more like a new beginning.

A slightly downgraded version of Street Fighter Alpha was also released for Capcom's older CPS I arcade board. This was done because Capcom feared that some arcades would not be willing to upgrade to the CPS II board. This version features a different soundtrack with less sound effects.

Release
Versions of Street Fighter Alpha were initially released for the PlayStation and the Sega Saturn. Due to the small amount of character animation data in Street Fighter Alpha, Capcom was able to do a relatively straight port to the Sega Saturn and PlayStation; source code from the arcade version is incorporated into both home versions.Both versions feature an arranged soundtrack with a choice between the Arranged and Original versions. In addition to a dedicated two-player "Versus Mode", these were also the first console Street Fighter games to feature a Training Mode, allowing players to practice their techniques and combos on a non-hostile character. As part of their Capcom licensing deal, the home versions were published in Europe by Virgin Interactive instead of Capcom. The PlayStation version of Street Fighter Alpha was re-released for the PSP and PlayStation 3 via the PlayStation Network on August 14, 2008 in North America.
A version for Capcoms CPS Changer was also released as a mail order release in 1996 in Japan, this was based on the CPS-1 version. A Windows PC version was released in 1998, based on the PlayStation version.

A Game Boy Color version (converted by Crawfish Interactive) was released in 1999, featuring downscaled graphics and sound. The Game Boy Color version has no link cable support and is single-player only. The Japanese version of the Game Boy Color version was released using the Alpha name, rather than the Zero name.

The original Street Fighter Alpha and its sequels are featured in Street Fighter Alpha Anthology for the PlayStation 2. The version of Alpha in this compilation features Arcade, Versus and Training modes like the previous PlayStation and Saturn versions, as well as Survival and Dramatic Battle modes. The Dramatic Battle on the main menu differs from the one in the original arcade game in that the player can select any pair of characters and face against a series of four computer-controlled opponents (Adon, Sagat, M. Bison and Akuma), not just Ryu and Ken against Bison. Furthermore, the player can turn on an option to allow Super Cancels, that is, canceling a special move into a Super Combo.

Street Fighter Alpha was one of the twelve games released as part of the Street Fighter 30th Anniversary Collection in its emulated arcade form. This version is on the PlayStation 4, Xbox One, Nintendo Switch and Steam with the feature of save states.

Reception

In Japan, Game Machine listed Street Fighter Zero on their August 1, 1995 issue as being the second most-successful arcade game of the month. It went on to be the second highest-grossing arcade game of 1995 in Japan, below Virtua Fighter 2. In North America, RePlay reported Street Fighter Alpha was the most-popular arcade game in August 1995.

In the United Kingdom, it was among the nineteen best-selling PlayStation games of 1996, according to HMV.

Reviewing the arcade version, Computer and Video Games praised the improved sprite graphics and innovative gameplay features such as the revamped Super Combo system and the new Alpha Counter mechanic. The review said it's "fast, exciting, visually explosive and for our money a dead cert hit." A critic for Next Generation criticized the game's lack of major changes from previous iterations of the series, but concluded, "Capcom's right, in a way. Street Fighter only needs subtle changes for now; it's already got the most important thing: great gameplay."

Electronic Gaming Monthly gave the PlayStation version their "Game of the Month" award, and reviewers for Electronic Gaming Monthly, GamePro, and Maximum all hailed it as being virtually identical to the arcade version, though some of them complained about the load times. GamePro called it "easily the best argument that the PlayStation is not just a polygon-based system", while Maximum deemed it "the next logical evolvement of the most popular fighting game of all time." Reviewers were also pleased with Alpha's new gameplay mechanics such as alpha counters.

Reviewing the Saturn version, Sega Saturn Magazine commented: "The graphics are great, the sound's great, it plays very well indeed and it's tough enough to keep you going for ages even without a second player to hand." However, they also remarked that the game was outclassed by the recently released X-Men: Children of the Atom and that most gamers should get that one instead. GamePro criticized that some of the game's new characters were not as powerful or fun to play as the series regulars, but praised the gameplay additions and deemed the Saturn version "a near-perfect arcade conversion." Maximum argued that while the game has fewer characters and backgrounds than Super Street Fighter II Turbo and makes few innovations to the series, it is refined to the point where "Everything that Street Fighter does so well has been taken to new levels in Alpha." They commented on the accuracy of the Saturn version and gave it their "Maximum Game of the Month" award. Both GamePro and Maximum particularly applauded the coloration of the Super Move shadows in the Saturn version. In 1996, GamesMaster ranked the game 43rd on their "Top 100 Games of All Time."

The Game Boy Color version was a runner-up for GameSpots annual "Best Game Boy Color Game" and "Best Fighting Game" awards, losing to Dragon Warrior I & II and Capcom vs. SNK: Millennium Fight 2000, respectively.

Legacy

Sequels
Street Fighter Alpha was followed by two sequels: Street Fighter Alpha 2 in 1996 and Street Fighter Alpha 3 in 1998. Like Alpha, the two games were originally released for the arcades, followed by a few upgraded editions and home versions. All three games in the series and their variations were included in the PlayStation 2 compilation Street Fighter Alpha Anthology, released in 2006.

Related media
A manga adaptation based on the original Alpha and Alpha 2 by Masahiko Nakahira was published in Gamest game from 1995 to 1996, and was later adapted into English by UDON in 2007. Two different animated adaptations were also produced: Street Fighter Alpha: The Animation in 1999 and Street Fighter Alpha: Generations in 2005.

Notes

References

Sources

External links

 
 STREET FIGHTER ALPHA ONLINE

1995 video games
Fighting games
2D fighting games
Arcade video games
Capcom Power System Changer games
CP System II games
Game Boy Color games
Interquel video games
PlayStation (console) games
PlayStation 2 games
PlayStation Network games
Sega Saturn games
Street Fighter games
Video games developed in Japan
Video games scored by Akari Kaida
Video games scored by Naoshi Mizuta
Video games set in China
Video games set in Japan
Video games set in Rome
Video games set in Thailand
Video games set in the United States
Video games with alternate endings
Virgin Interactive games
Windows games
Zeebo games
J2ME games
Crawfish Interactive games
Multiplayer and single-player video games